Vamanapuram Bus Route is a 2004 Indian Malayalam-language comedy-drama film directed by Sonu Shishupal and written by Sudheesh John, starring Mohanlal and Lakshmi Gopalaswamy. Shishupal also composed the songs featured in the film, while C. Rajamani provided the background score. The film was released on 23 January 2004.

Plot

The hamlet of Vamanapuram has no bus service. The conflict between the ruling party and the opposition in the Panchayath prevents any development in the village. The Panchayath President Gopalan Nair's ambition is to become a minister or at least a member of the Legislative Assembly. To finance his plans, he wants to pave the roads with asphalt and get funds from it. But the opposition stirs up trouble every time he tries. Then comes Lever Johnny and how he solves the problems forms the rest of the story.

Cast

Mohanlal as Lever Johnny
Lakshmi Gopalaswamy as Meenakshi Nair
Jagathy Sreekumar as Gopalan Nair, Panchayat President and Meenakshi's father
Janardhanan as Bahuleyan
Adithya Menon as Karippidi Gopi
Nandhu as Kuttappan
Oduvil Unnikrishnan as Appukkuttan
Machan Varghese as Velayudhan
Innocent as Chandran Pillai
Kottayam Naseer as Chackochan
Maniyanpilla Raju as Rajappan
Jagadish as Kumaran
Rajan P. Dev as Ouseppu
Augustine as Kuliru Thankappan
V. K. Sreeraman as Gangadharan
Baiju as Kunjachan
K. T. S. Padannayil as Velappan Nair / Mummy Maman, Gopalan's father-in-law and Meenakshi's maternal grandfather
Joby as Mathappu
Manka Mahesh as Ambujam, Gopalan Nair's wife and Meenakshi's mother
Abu Salim
Ambika Mohan
Saju Kodiyan
A. S. Joby

Soundtrack
Beside directing, Sonu Shishupal also composed the songs featured in the film, lyrics were by Gireesh Puthenchery. The background score was composed by C. Rajamani. The film reused the song "Rajavin Paarvai" from the 1966 Tamil film Anbe Vaa, originally composed by M. S. Viswanathan. The soundtrack album was released by MC Audios & Videos.

Release and reception
Vamanapuram Bus Route was released on 23 January 2004. It opened in 36 theatres across Kerala. The film received unfavourable reviews from critics. Sify's critic wrote that "our heart goes out to Mohanlal, one of the finest actors in the country who is being wasted in insipid films". Despite the criticism, the film managed to remain in all 36 theatres in its third week. In a 19 February 2004 box office report, The Hindu wrote that "Mohanlal's Vamanapuram Bus Route is doing its third week in 36 centres in Kerala and doing good business outside Kerala".

References

External links
 

2004 films
2000s Malayalam-language films
Indian comedy-drama films
2004 comedy-drama films
Films shot in Thiruvananthapuram